Mary Elizabeth "Betsy" Cullen (born August 14, 1938) is an American professional golfer who played on the LPGA Tour.

Cullen was born in Tulsa, Oklahoma. She graduated from University of Oklahoma in 1960 with a degree in Physical Education. She turned professional in 1962 and became a teaching pro. In 1965, she joined the LPGA Tour.

Cullen won three times on the LPGA Tour between 1972 and 1975.

After her playing career, Cullen became a club professional.

Professional wins (3)

LPGA Tour wins (3)

References

External links

American female golfers
Oklahoma Sooners women's golfers
LPGA Tour golfers
Golfers from Oklahoma
Sportspeople from Tulsa, Oklahoma
1938 births
Living people